Veselin Anastasov Stoyanov (Веселин Анастасов Стоянов) (20 April 1902 in Shumen – 29 June 1969 in Sofia) was a Bulgarian composer.

In 1937, he began teaching and later became professor of music theory courses at the National Academy of Music (Bulgaria). Stoyanov raised the level of music theory teaching in Bulgaria. His students included Todor Popov, Dimitar Petkov, Stefan Remenkov, Alexander Tekeliev, Ivan Marinov and others.

Works
 Three concertos for piano and orchestra (1942, 1953, 1966); Concerto for Violin and Orchestra; Concerto for Cello and Orchestra; Concertino for violin
 Two symphonies; symphonic suite grotesque Bai Ganyo; Festival Overture; symphonic poem Song of Blood; Rhapsody for symphony orchestra
 Operas:
Kingdom of Women,
Salambo
Sly Peter 1958
 Ballet Pope Joanna
 Cantatas
 Songs

Recordings
 Aria from opera Cunning Peter (хитър Петър) on the story of the folk hero Hitar Petar. Krassimira Stoyanova Orfeo

References

1902 births
1969 deaths
Bulgarian composers
People from Shumen
20th-century composers